Ray Fitzgerald may refer to:

 Ray Fitzgerald (baseball) (1904–1977), American baseball player
 Ray Fitzgerald (journalist) (1927–1982), American sports journalist
 Ray Fitzgerald (politician) (1897–1963), Australian politician
 Ray Fitzgerald (poet), American cowboy poet